Three Men and a Little Lady is a 1990 American comedy film directed by Emile Ardolino. It is the sequel to the 1987 film Three Men and a Baby, and the second installment overall in the franchise of the same name. Tom Selleck, Steve Guttenberg, and Ted Danson reprise the leading roles.

Plot
Peter, Michael, and Jack are living happily together with Mary, who is now five, and her mother, Sylvia. Peter and Michael continue as an architect and cartoonist, while Jack has little acting work. Sylvia has become a famous actress and is dating director Edward who wishes to marry her, but Sylvia is unsure how it will affect Mary.

Sylvia and Peter are clearly in love with each other, although he won't admit his true feelings. When visiting, Sylvia's mother warns her that he may never be able to express or admit his feelings. Sylvia, realizing she wants to get married and start a family, accepts Edward's proposal, announcing she and Mary will be moving to the UK after the wedding.

Inviting Edward to the apartment, Peter tells him he believes he won't be a good father for Mary. When he leaves, Sylvia confronts Peter, leading to a falling out when she calls him selfish, and he reminds her she abandoned Mary once (as described in the first film).

Sylvia and Mary leave the next day for the UK. The men, depressed, try to cheer themselves up with one of their bachelor-style parties, but are still miserable without Mary and Sylvia. They go to the UK to visit Mary, who is unhappy without them. Peter and Michael arrive in time for the rehearsal dinner, happily reuniting with Mary and Sylvia. Miss Elspeth Lomax, headmistress of Pileforth Academy for Girls, is introduced to Peter by Edward (who tells her Peter is secretly interested in her). Peter and Sylvia apologize to each other for the fight.

With the wedding imminent, Peter is concerned as Mary says Edward dislikes her. Peter and Michael realize Edward plans to send Mary to Pileforth boarding school. Edward denies it and Sylvia refuses to believe Peter, as he has always disliked him. Jack arrives mid-argument and Sylvia and Edward leave. Peter admits he loves Sylvia but stayed silent because of him. Jack insists that Sylvia only loves Peter and must follow his heart.

The night before the wedding, Peter goes to Pileforth to get proof of Edward's scheme. Elspeth believes Peter is admitting his "feelings", throwing herself at him. Very surprised and deflecting her advances, he gets away. His car breaks down, finally he calls Jack and Michael, confirming he has the proof, but he will be late. Michael, Jack and Mary try to stall the wedding. Michael kidnaps the vicar and Jack disguises himself as an elderly replacement. Peter, with help from Elspeth, heads to the wedding. During the ride, she says Edward told her Peter was interested in her, but Peter says Edward lied, apologizing for him.

After numerous delays they arrive at the church. Peter shows Sylvia the truth, Elspeth confirming that Edward has been lying and he, trying to defend himself, prompts Mary to accuse him of lying again. He shows his true colors, swearing at Mary and Peter, who then punches him out. Sylvia insists she's going home, but Peter stops her, ultimately declaring his love. Then, Edward regains consciousness, stating it is too late as they are already married. Jack then reveals himself – he has both finally proven his acting skills, and the marriage is not valid.

Peter and Sylvia wed with Mary as their bridesmaid, who afterwards throws the bouquet into the air; it is caught by a shocked Jack.

Cast
 Tom Selleck as Peter Mitchell
 Steve Guttenberg as Michael Kellam
 Ted Danson as Jack Holden
 Nancy Travis as Sylvia Bennington-Mitchell
 Christopher Cazenove as Edward Hargreave
 Fiona Shaw as Miss Elspeth Lomax
 Robin Weisman as Mary Bennington
 John Boswall as Barrow, Edward's butler
 Sheila Hancock as Vera Bennington

Production
Filmed on location in New York and the United Kingdom, the scenes in the latter location were primarily shot in Banbury in north Oxfordshire. Particular use is made of Broughton Castle. The scenes where the car breaks down and Peter makes a call from a phone box are shot at Burton Dassett Country Park, in south Warwickshire. The school which Mary was to attend (Pileforth Academy) was shot at two locations. The external shot of the school is the Jesuit boarding school Stonyhurst College in the Ribble Valley, Lancashire. The internal scenes of the school were shot at the (former) Benedictine boarding school Douai School near Thatcham, West Berkshire.

Release

Box office
In its opening weekend, the movie was screened at 1,281 theaters, earning $19.1 million and finishing in 2nd place behind Home Alone. By the end of the second week, it had dropped to 3rd place with a total gross of $29.8 million and by the end of the third week was in 5th place with a total gross of $35.9 million. It eventually grossed $71.6 million.

Reception
On the review aggregator website Rotten Tomatoes, the film holds an approval rating of 40% based on 20 reviews, with an average rating of 4.4/10.

Critics Rita Kempley and Desson Howe of The Washington Post wrote positively of the film, citing the three main characters' comical rap, the race for Peter to stop the wedding, and the relationship between him and Miss Lomax as the film's most enjoyable scenes. However, Howe also criticized it, claiming Ted Danson and Steve Guttenberg were overshadowed for the remainder of the film.

Soundtrack
One of the most widely recognized tracks from the film is "Waiting for a Star to Fall" by Boy Meets Girl, which featured during the final wedding scene and end credits. The film's soundtrack album contains the three leads' singing "Goodnite, Sweetheart, Goodnite" from Three Men and a Baby, which had no soundtrack album of its own.

Reboot
In June 2010, a third film tentatively titled Three Men and a Bride was announced to be developed by Disney.

The project was eventually abandoned in favor of a reboot. As of December 2020, the as-of-yet untitled reboot is in development, with Zac Efron cast in a starring role. The film is intended to be a streaming exclusive film, for Disney+. As of January 2023 the film has yet to be made.

References

External links

 
 
 
 
 

1990 films
1990s buddy comedy films
1990s children's comedy films
American buddy comedy films
American children's comedy films
American sequel films
Fictional quartets
Films scored by James Newton Howard
Films about weddings
Films directed by Emile Ardolino
Films set in New York City
Films set in London
Films shot in Berkshire
Films shot in Lancashire
Films shot in New York City
Films shot in Oxfordshire
Films shot in Warwickshire
Interscope Communications films
Touchstone Pictures films
1990 comedy films
1990s English-language films
1990s American films